Fundella argentina is a species of snout moth in the genus Fundella. It was described by Harrison Gray Dyar Jr. in 1919 and is known from Florida, Texas, Mexico, Cuba, Puerto Rico, Haiti, Jamaica, Venezuela, Ecuador, Brazil and Argentina.

The larvae feed on Cassia species, Caesalpinia gilliessii and Canavalia gladiata.

References

Phycitinae
Moths of the Caribbean
Moths of Central America
Moths of South America
Moths of North America
Moths described in 1919